The 2017 labor reform in Brazil was a significant change in the country's Consolidation of Labor Laws. According to the government, the goal of the reform was to combat unemployment and the still ongoing 2014 Brazilian economic crisis.

The bill was proposed and sent to the Chamber of Deputies by the president Michel Temer on December 23, 2016. Since then, during its processing in the National Congress, it was going through several debates and additions to the original bill, for example, the proposal to end the obligatory syndicate (labor union) tax paid by workers hired under the CLT.

The bill was approved by the Chamber on April 26, 2017, with 296 favorable votes and 177 against. Later, in the Federal Senate, it was approved on July 11, 2017, by 50 versus 26 votes. It was then sanctioned by the president on July 13, 2017, with no vetoes. The law will start to be valid on November 11 of the same year, 120 days after the sanction.

Labor reform was controversial in Brazilian society. Its supporters argue that the reform addresses legal certainty and increase the number of jobs.  Its critics argue that the reform violates the Brazilian constitution and International Labour Organization conventions signed by Brazil.

Changes 
Most of the changes involve intricate details. The most simple changes were:

See also 
 2017 Brazilian general strike
 Outsourcing law in Brazil

References 

Government of Michel Temer
2017 in Brazil
Brazilian labour law